Gordon Glover "Slinger" Dunn (April 16, 1912 – July 26, 1964) was an American discus thrower who won a silver medal at the 1936 Summer Olympics, a U.S. Navy lieutenant, and former mayor of Fresno, California from 1949-1957.

Godron Dunn was born April 16, 1912, to William F. Dunn and Olive C. Glover in Portland, Oregon. Dunn's father, William F. Dunn once served as the deputy city clerk for Fresno. Shortly after Dunn was born, the family moved home to Fresno, where the Dunn family had lived since the 1880s. Dunn's paternal grandfather, Thomas Dunn, was a pioneer resident of Fresno, a former councilmember, and potential mayoral candidate. Dunn Avenue is named for his grandfather, Thomas Dunn. Dunn graduated from Fresno High School and attended Stanford University. Dunn's penchant for track and field, and specifically discus throw, allowed him to continue these sports through both high school and college. Earlier in 1934 he won the NCAA and IC4A titles. After college, Dunn remained in Menlo Park.

1936 Berlin Olympics
Dunn participated in the discus competition for the United States Olympic Team at the 1936 Summer Olympics in Berlin, Germany. Dunn qualified in second position behind fellow U.S. Olympian Ken Carpenter. In the Final round, Dunn threw for 49.36 meters (161 feet, 10 3/4 inches) earning him a Silver Medal. The 1936 Olympics would be Dunn's first and only appearance due to the next Olympic games not occurring again until 1948 Summer Olympics as a result of World War II.

Military service
Dunn returned to Menlo Park, where he divorced is first wife, Marjorie Kitselman, in 1938. He married Naomi McCool shortly after the divorce and moved back to his birthplace of Portland where he took a job working as a merchandizing salesman for  Associated Oil. In 1942, Dunn joined the U.S. Navy and became a Lieutenant Commander in Office of Naval Intelligence for the duration of the war.

Political career
Dunn ran for mayor in April 1949 under a platform of cleaning up the city. Dunn won the election over incumbent Mayor Glenn M. DeVore. When elected, he was the youngest mayor of Fresno at the time. During his first term, he led raids on bordellos and gambling dens. In addition, he sought to regulate pinball machines to outlaw their use for gambling in the city. Dunn also pushed for conversion of the Downtown Fresno streets to one-way traffic to lessen traffic gridlock, the upgrade of paving of the city streets, and the removal of street parking in favor of surface parking. Dunn also outlawed street racing amongst firefighters. For his zest in fighting crime and bringing order on city employees he qualified for the new nickname of "No-Fun Dunn." He frequented going to fire and police meeting and events, and is known to have had both red lights and a siren installed on his personal vehicle. Gordon ran for a second term in 1953 and won with 65% of the vote. His second term would see a similar platforms as his first term including significant increases to the Fresno Police Department staff rosters and budget. Dunn ran in 1957 for a third term and lost to C. Cal Evans. In 1958 the city charter was approved and the mayoral office was to be voted on again. Dunn ran in 1958 again for a third term but came in third place behind Evans and Arthur L. Selland.

Post-political career
Dunn left Fresno and moved to San Francisco, California where he resided until death. In 1964, Gordon Dunn was inducted into the Fresno County Athletic Hall of Fame. On July 26, 1964, Gordon Dunn died of a heart attack at the age of 52, the same cause of death that took his grandfather 51 years earlier.

References

External links

1912 births
1964 deaths
Track and field athletes from Portland, Oregon
Athletes (track and field) at the 1936 Summer Olympics
American male discus throwers
Olympic silver medalists for the United States in track and field
Stanford Cardinal men's track and field athletes
Track and field athletes from California
Medalists at the 1936 Summer Olympics
Mayors of Fresno, California